D204 is a state road connecting Pribanjci and nearby border crossing to Slovenia to D3 state road in Bosanci, and the road also serves as a connecting road to the A1 motorway as it terminates in Bosiljevo 1 interchange. The northern terminus of the road is located at Aržano border crossing, providing access to Livno in Bosnia and Herzegovina.

The road, as well as all other state roads in Croatia, is managed and maintained by Hrvatske ceste, state owned company.

Traffic volume 

Traffic is regularly counted and reported by Hrvatske ceste, operator of the road. Substantial variations between annual (AADT) and summer (ASDT) traffic volumes are attributed to the fact that the road serves as an approach to the Croatian A1 motorway carrying considerable tourist traffic.

Road junctions and populated areas

Sources

State roads in Croatia
Transport in Karlovac County